Storjohann is a surname. Notable people with the surname include:

Gero Storjohann (1958–2023), German politician
Johan Storjohann (1832–1914), Norwegian priest, educator, and non-fiction writer
Nanna Storjohann (1838–1898), Norwegian proponent for public morals, wife of Johan
Sage Storjohann (1998-Present), American Author, poet

de:Storjohann